Henriettea ininiensis is a species of plant in the family Melastomataceae. It is endemic to French Guiana.

References

Endemic flora of French Guiana
ininiensis
Vulnerable plants
Taxonomy articles created by Polbot
Taxobox binomials not recognized by IUCN